Rosa Cooper (1829 – 4 September 1877) was an English actor and manager, popular in Australia.

History 
Cooper was married to actor Lionel Harding.

They first appeared on the Australian stage in December 1863 in the drama Catherine Howard; or, the Throne, the Tomb, and the Scaffold, with Cooper as Howard, betrothed and secretly married to Percy, Duke of Northumberland, played by Harding.

She was particularly noted for her Lady Isabel in a stage version of East Lynne.

She had been ailing when she left Australia by the RMSS Pera in 1875, and died in India shortly after being released from hospital.

References 

1850 births
1925 deaths
19th-century English actresses
19th-century Australian actresses